Havagazı is a light-rail station on the Konak Tram of the Tram İzmir system in İzmir, Turkey. Originally named Liman, it is located along Liman Avenue and consists of a side platform and one track. Only Fahrettin Altay-bound (Westbound) trams stop at Havagazı, since eastbound trams travel along Şehitler Avenue one block south. 

The station opened on 24 March 2018.

Connections
ESHOT operates city bus service on Liman Avenue.

References

Railway stations opened in 2018
2018 establishments in Turkey
Konak District
Tram transport in İzmir